Swaraj Abhiyan is an Indian political party that began on 14 April 2015. It was formed by Yogendra Yadav and anti-corruption activist Prashant Bhushan in Gurgaon following their expulsion from the Aam Aadmi Party. The organisation claims  to transform ideology into reality and to achieve Swaraj in all aspects of life - political, economical, social and cultural. On 31 July 2016, Swaraj Abhiyan announced the decision to form a political front, Swaraj India. Subsequently on 2 October 2016, a political party - Swaraj India was announced, with intention to participate in local body elections to start with.

Background 
In late 2014, Prashant Bhushan alleged that the selection process for Aam Aadmi Party (AAP) candidates in the forthcoming 2015 Delhi Legislative Assembly election was not in accordance with the founding principles of the party. This started a series of allegations and counter-allegations which resulted in the removal of Yogendra Yadav and Bhushan from the party's Political Affairs Committee in 2015.

These developments led to an open dialogue - Swaraj Samwad - conducted by supporters of Yadav and Bhushan on 14 April 2015 to discuss the situation and the future direction. The outcome was the formation of Swaraj Abhiyan.

Bhushan is current National President of Swaraj Abhiyan.

Jai Kisan Andolan 
Swaraj Abhiyan launched a nationwide public movement called Jai Kisan Andolan to bring attention to farmers' rights in India. This aims to highlight the plight of farmers due to alleged lapses in public policies related to agriculture. Currently it is coordinating between small farmer groups across the country to raise voices against amendments in Land Acquisition Act, farmer compensations, rationalisation of minimum support price for crops and demand for a pay commission for farmers. Yogendra Yadav is National Convener of Jai Kisan Andolan.

In December 2015, Prashant Bhushan filed a Public Interest Litigation with the Supreme Court of India on behalf of Swaraj Abhiyan, requesting the court's intervention to ensuring proper supply of grains, pulses and sugar through the public distribution system in drought-affected states, as prescribed by the national food security law of 2013.

References

External links
  

Political advocacy groups in India
Political parties established in 2016
Political parties in India
2015 establishments in Uttar Pradesh